Anatoli Vasilyevich Parov (17 September 1956 – 28 September 2013) was a Soviet football player.

Honours
 Soviet Top League winner: 1976 (spring).
 Soviet Cup winner: 1977.

International career
Born in Moscow, Parov made his debut for USSR on 28 November 1976 in a friendly against Argentina.

External links
  Profile

References

1956 births
Footballers from Moscow
2013 deaths
Soviet footballers
Soviet Union international footballers
Russian footballers
FC Dynamo Moscow players
FC Lokomotiv Moscow players
FC Tobol Kurgan players
Soviet Top League players
Association football defenders